= Japanese Winter Olympics =

Japanese Winter Olympics may refer to:

- 1972 Winter Olympics in Sapporo, Hokkaidō Prefecture
- 1998 Winter Olympics in Nagano, Nagano Prefecture
